Wood River may refer to:

Rivers

In Canada 
 Wood River (British Columbia), a tributary of the Columbia River via Kinbasket Lake
 Wood River (Saskatchewan), a river in south-west Saskatchewan

In Ireland 
 Wood River (County Clare), Kilrush

In the United States 
 Wood River (Nushagak River tributary) (Alaska)
 Wood River (Illinois), a tributary of the Mississippi
 Wood River (Oregon)
 Wood River (Pawcatuck River), Connecticut & Rhode Island
 Wood River (Nebraska)
 Wood River (Wisconsin), a tributary of the St. Croix River 
 Big Wood River, Idaho
 Little Wood River (Idaho)
 Wood River Valley, Idaho
 Wood River or Wood's River for Abraham Wood, a colonial financier; now the New River (Kanawha River) in West Virginia, Virginia, and North Carolina

Places

In Canada 
 Wood River (electoral district), in Saskatchewan
 Wood River No. 74, Saskatchewan, a rural municipality

In the United States 
 Wood River, Alaska
 Wood River, Illinois
 Wood River, Nebraska
 Wood River, Wisconsin

See also 
 Wood River Township (disambiguation)